Devon Dikeou (born 1963) is an American artist, publisher, and art collector. Dikeou’s practice investigates the "in-between" — subtle interactions between artist, art object, viewer, space, and context.

Life and education

Devon Dikeou is originally from Denver, Colorado. She received a B.A. from Brown University in 1986 and an M.F.A. from the School of Visual Arts in 1988.

Since the start of her career in the early 1990s, Dikeou has received several artist awards and nominations including The Sue Canon Award from the Museum of Contemporary Art Denver (2007), Assistance League of Houston (2011 and 2013), Santo Foundation (2012), and the DAM Key Award from Denver Art Museum (2017).

Exhibitions 

Dikeou has exhibited at numerous international museums, foundations, and galleries including the New Museum, The Contemporary Austin, Boulder Museum of Contemporary Art, Artpace San Antonio, Tricia Collins Grand Salon, James Fuentes Gallery in 2017 and 2018, 179 Canal, Kai Matsumiya, and Postmasters. She has also shown at art fairs, including Art Basel Statements, The Armory Show, Independent, NADA Miami Beach, and NADA New York.

Dikeou's mid-career retrospective "Mid-Career Smear" opened at The Dikeou Collection in February 2020.

zingmagazine 

Devon Dikeou published the first issue of zingmagazine in 1995. zingmagazine is composed of rotating multi-page curatorial projects organized by artists and arts professionals.

The Dikeou Collection 

In 1998, Devon Dikeou founded the Dikeou Collection along with her brother Pany Dikeou. The Dikeou Collection is a private contemporary art collection in downtown Denver, Colorado, and features work from over 40 international artists and functions as extension of zingmagazine.

References

External links

 
 zingmagazine
 Dikeou Collection

American women artists
Artists from Denver
Artists from New York (state)
American magazine editors
American magazine publishers (people)
American art collectors
1963 births
Living people
Brown University alumni
School of Visual Arts alumni
21st-century American women